is a Japanese adult bishōjo visual novel for the PC. The original DOS version was published in 1996 by Sakura Soft. It was translated to English by JAST USA, and later re-released for modern Windows systems in 2002 as part of the "JAST USA Memorial Pack" along with Season of the Sakura and Runaway City.

Gameplay
The gameplay is standard for a visual novel. The player reads text at the bottom of the screen, which is accompanied by static images. A number of choices are made during the course of the game, letting the player direct the main character through the plot, and into sexual encounters with Yuki, Emi or Risa, the three main female characters, as well as with a number of other females.

Plot
Koichi and Eiichi are two brothers, who were separated after the suicide of their father and the collapse of his business. Ten years later, Eiichi tracks Koichi down, and tells him that all their misfortune was because of a man named Okamura. Eiichi is now rich and has control over an important company, and financially supports his brother, who lives near Okamura's daughters. Eiichi has driven Okamura to bankruptcy and away from his three daughters, Yuki, Emi and Risa. Koichi starts investigating Okamura's three daughters, but he falls in love with one of the sisters, Emi, and starts a relationship with her.

Over the course of a few days, Koichi discovers the secret ambition of his brother, totally swallowed up by his desire for money: Eiichi is forcing women into prostitution. Eiichi, who wants vengeance at all cost against the Okamuras, starts to persecute them: he offers work to Yuki, the eldest, in a lingerie bar; she agrees, because of the financial problem of the Okamuras. Eiichi also gives lingerie to Risa, the youngest, and he kidnaps Emi. This prompts Koichi to turn against his brother and infiltrate his office to rescue her. After rescuing her, there will be several possible endings, depending on whether the player chose to have sex with Risa, Yuki, his schoolmates, or some combination of the above. If he didn't, then Koichi survives after the building catches fire. Eiichi burns to death inside the building, trying to keep the money with him. Emi confesses her love for Koichi, and the three sisters' father returns home.

Reception

Metacritic describes Three Sisters' Story as a game with a "complex dramatic story" with a "rich" story.

Censorship

Three Sisters' Story is banned in New Zealand for the depiction of sexual exploitation of minors.

References

External links

1996 video games
DOS games
Eroge
Video games developed in Japan
Visual novels
Windows games